Andrew Weiss may refer to:

 Andrew Weiss (economist) (born 1947), American economist and investor
 Andrew Weiss (guitarist) ( 1982), American bass guitarist and producer